Erikssonia is a genus of fungi in the family Phyllachoraceae.

The genus name of Erikssonia is in honour of Jakob Eriksson (1848 – 1931), who was a Swedish plant pathologist, mycologist and a taxonomist.

The genus was circumscribed by Albert Julius Otto Penzig and Pier Andrea Saccardo in Malpighia Vol.11 on page 526 in 1898.

Distribution
It is only recorded as being found in Central America.

Species
As accepted by Species Fungorum;
Erikssonia carissae 
Erikssonia melastomacearum 
Erikssonia protii 
Erikssonia pulchella 
Erikssonia spatholobi

References

External links
Index Fungorum

Sordariomycetes genera
Phyllachorales
Taxonomy articles created by Polbot